Walk On is an album by singer-songwriter John Hiatt, released in 1995. It was his first album with Capitol Records.

The album peaked at No. 48 on the Billboard 200 chart.

Production
Hiatt wrote the songs while touring to promote Perfectly Good Guitar. The guitarist David Immerglück replaced Mike Ward for the recording sessions.

Critical reception
The Encyclopedia of Popular Music called the title track one of Hiatt's "most infectious songs." In its review, Entertainment Weekly called Hiatt "country rock’s best singer-songwriter." Trouser Press wrote that Walk On "calmly returns Hiatt to the rustic folk-roots sound of his most natural habitat, with mixed but generally positive results." The Chicago Tribune called it Hiatt's best since Bring the Family.

Track listing
All tracks written by John Hiatt

"Cry Love" – 4:20
"You Must Go" – 5:01
"Walk On" – 5:11
"Good as She Could Be" – 3:28
"The River Knows Your Name" – 4:25
"Native Son" – 3:55
"Dust Down a Country Road" – 4:04
"Ethylene" – 4:03
"I Can't Wait" – 4:25
"Shredding the Document" – 5:02
"Wrote It Down and Burned It" – 6:02
"Your Love Is My Rest" – 4:34
"Friend of Mine" – 14:22 (The song "Friend of Mine" ends at 3:22. After 2 minutes [3:22 – 5:22] begins the hidden song "Mile High" [5:22 – 14:22], included on the Capitol release but not mentioned, listed as bonus track on the European and BMG releases)

Personnel
John Hiatt – electric guitar and acoustic guitar, vocals, electric piano, Wurlitzer
Davey Faragher – bass guitar, background vocals
David Immerglück – electric guitar, slide guitar, mandolin, pedal steel guitar, three-stringed guitar, background Vocals
Michael Urbano – drums, percussion

Additional musicians
Lisa Haley – violin on "Walk On" and "The River Knows Your Name"
Gary Louris – background vocals on "You Must Go"
Mark Olson – background vocals on "You Must Go"
Bonnie Raitt – background vocals on "I Can't Wait"
Benmont Tench – piano and harpsichord on "Shredding the Document" and pump organ on "The River Knows Your Name"

Production
Don Smith – producer, mixer
Tim Devine – executive producer
Gary Gersh – executive producer 
Davey Faragher – associate producer 
Shelly Yakus – mixer

References

External links
Hiatt's homepage for Walk On

1995 albums
Capitol Records albums
John Hiatt albums